The 1997 Three Days of De Panne was the 21st edition of the Three Days of De Panne cycle race and was held on 31 March to 2 April 1997. The race started in Harelbeke and finished in De Panne. The race was won by Johan Museeuw.

General classification

References

Three Days of Bruges–De Panne
1997 in Belgian sport